Tajbakhsh is a Persian surname. Notable persons with this name include:
Aryan Tajbakhsh (born 1990), English footballer
Kian Tajbakhsh (born 1962), Iranian-American scholar, social scientist and urban planner
Shahrbanou Tadjbakhsh (born 1965), Iranian-American researcher
[[Shahragim Tajbakhsh]], Research Scientist at Institut Pasteur, France

Iranian-language surnames